Archibald Howie (13 April 1908 – 12 September 1990) was a Canadian sailor. He competed in the Dragon event at the 1952 Summer Olympics.

References

External links
 

1908 births
1990 deaths
Canadian male sailors (sport)
Olympic sailors of Canada
Sailors at the 1952 Summer Olympics – Dragon
Place of birth missing